
This is a timeline of Portuguese history, comprising important legal and territorial changes and political events in Portugal and its predecessor states. To read about the background to these events, see History of Portugal.

 Centuries: 3rd BC2nd BC1st BC3rd5th6th8th9th10th11th12th13th14th15th16th17th
18th19th20th21st

3rd century BC

2nd century BC

1st century BC

3rd century

5th century

6th century

8th century

9th century

10th century

11th century

12th century

13th century

14th century

15th century

16th century

17th century

18th century

19th century

20th century

21st century

References

Bibliography 
in English
 
 

 
 
 

in Portuguese
 . 1885?

External links